Jennifer Estep is an American author of urban fantasy and paranormal romance novels under Pocket Books.  She is most known for the Mythos Academy and Elemental Assassin series.

In 2018 she began publication of her new Crown of Shards epic fantasy series with Harper Voyager.

Book List
 Black Blade 
 Cold Burn of Magic (Book 1) (Apr 28, 2015)
 Dark Heart of Magic (Book 2) (Oct 27, 2015)
 Bright Blaze of Magic (Book 3) (Apr 26, 2016)

 Elemental Assassin
 Spider's Bite (Book 1) (Jan 26, 2010)
 Web of Lies (Book 2) (May 25, 2010)
 Venom (Book 3) (Sep 28, 2010)
 Tangled Threads (Book 4) (Apr 26, 2011)
 Spider's Revenge (Book 5) (Sep 27, 2011)
 Thread of Death (E-Novella 5.5) (Jan 31, 2012)
 By a Thread (Book 6) (Feb 28, 2012)
 Widow's Web (Book 7) (Aug 21, 2012)
 Deadly Sting (Book 8) (Mar 26, 2013)
 Kiss of Venom (E-Novella 8.5) (Jul 22, 2013)
 Heart of Venom (Book 9) (Aug 27, 2013)
 The Spider (Book 10) (Dec 24, 2013)
 Poison Promise (Book 11) (July 22, 2014)
 Black Widow (Book 12) (2014)
 Spider's Trap (Book 13) (2015)
 Bitter Bite (Book 14) (2016)
 Unwanted (Novella 14.5) (2016) 
 Unraveled (Book 15) (2016)
 Nice Guys Bite  (Novella 15.5) (2016)
 Snared (Book 16) (2017) 
 Venom in the Veins (Book 17) (2018) 	
 Winters Web (Novella 17.5) (2019)
 Sharpest Sting (Book 18) (2020)
 Last Strand (Book 19) (2021)

Bigtime
 Karma Girl (Book 1) by Estep, Jennifer (Jul 1, 2008)
 Hot Mama (Book 2) by Estep, Jennifer (Nov 6, 2007)
 Jinx (Book 3) by Estep, Jennifer (Jul 11, 2011)
 A Karma Girl Christmas (E-Novella 3.5) (Sep 24, 2011)
 Nightingale (Book 4) (Jul 12, 2012)
Fandemic (Book 5) (Jun 2015)

Mythos Academy
 First Frost (0.5 Prequel E-Story) (Jul 1, 2011)
 Touch of Frost (Book 1) (Jul 26, 2011)
 Kiss of Frost (Book 2) (Nov 29, 2011)
 Dark Frost (Book 3) (Jun 1, 2012)
 Crimson Frost (Book 4) (Dec 24, 2012)
 Spartan Frost (E-Novella 4.5) (Jun 25, 2013)
 Midnight Frost (Book 5) (Jul 30, 2013)
 Killer Frost (Book 6) (Feb 25, 2014)
 Spartan Heart (Colorado 1) (Dec 5, 2017)
 Spartan Promise (Colorado 2) (Jan 15, 2019)
 Spartan Destiny (Colorado 3) (forthcoming)

Crown of Shards
 Kill the Queen (2018)
 Protect the Prince (2019)
 Crush the King (2020)

Section 47
 a Sense of Danger (Jul 20, 2021)
 Sugar Plum Spies (upcoming 2022)

Other
  Carniepunk anthology, by Rachel Caine, Jennifer Estep, Kevin Hearne, Seanan McGuire, and Rob Thurman
 Carniepunk: Parlor Tricks by Jennifer Estep (Jun 3, 2013)

External links
 http://www.jenniferestep.com/

References

Urban fantasy writers
Living people
Year of birth missing (living people)
American women novelists
American fantasy writers
Women science fiction and fantasy writers
21st-century American women